South Arabia is a historical region that consists of the southern region of the Arabian Peninsula in Western Asia, mainly centered in what is now the Republic of Yemen, yet it has also historically included Najran,  Jizan, Al-Bahah, and 'Asir, which are presently in Saudi Arabia, and the Dhofar of present-day Oman.

South Arabia is inhabited by people possessing distinctive linguistic and ethnic affinities, as well as traditions and culture, transcending recent political boundaries. There are two indigenous language groups: the now extinct Old South Arabian languages and the unrelated Modern South Arabian languages, both members of the Semitic family.

Etymology

The term Yamnat was mentioned in Old South Arabian inscriptions on the title of one of the kings of the second Himyarite Kingdom known as Shammar Yahrʽish II. The term was probably referring to the southwestern coastline of the Arabian peninsula and the southern coastline between Aden and Hadramout. Other sources claim that Yemen is related to yamn or yumn, meaning "felicity" or "blessed", as much of the country is fertile. The Romans called it Arabia Felix (fertile Arabia), as opposed to Arabia Deserta (deserted Arabia).
Classical Latin and Greek writers used the name "India" to refer to South Arabia (ancient Yemen). The use of the term "India" arose from the fact that the Persians called the Abyssinians whom they came into contact in South Arabia by the name of the Cushitic people who lived next to them, i.e., Indians. Southern Arabia was part of Indian Ocean trade routes for millennia. With the advent of the Omani Empire, ties were strengthened between India and the Eastern Coast of Africa and Madagascar.

History

Three thousand years ago, several ancient states occupied the region of South Arabia, being M'ain, Qataban, Hadhramaut, and Saba. In these ancient times South Arabia claimed several notable features: the famous dam at Marib, the cosmopolitan incense trade, as well as the legendary Queen of Sheba. Two thousand years ago the Himyarites became the masters of South Arabia, dominating the region for several centuries. The Ethiopian Kingdom of Aksum invaded South Arabia first in the 3rd–4th centuries, then later in the 6th under King Kaleb who subjugated the region, c. 520. They were displaced by Persian forces of the Sassanid dynasty, c.575, who also arrived by sea.  A half-century later, in the year 6 A.H. (628), the region converted to Islam.

Ancient South Arabia

Ancient kingdoms and appellations:
 Saba'
 Ma'īn
 Qatabān
 Ḥaḑramawt 
 Awsān 
 Himyar
 Arabia Felix (the term the Romans used to refer to South Arabia)
Pre-Islamic foreign occupiers:
 Axum (3rd–4th, 6th centuries)
 Sasanian Empire (6th–7th centuries).

South Arabian Islamic dynasties

 Umayyad 661–750
 Abbasid 750–897
 Ziyadid 819–1022
 Zaydi Imams 897-1962
 Najahid 1022-1158
 Sulaihid 1047–1138
 Zurayid 1083-1193
 Ayyubid 1174–1228
 Rasulid 1229–1454
 Tahiride 1454–1526

South Arabia in the early modern and colonial eras

 Northern
 Yemen Eyalet, Ottoman Empire (1517–1635)
 Yemen Vilayet, Ottoman Empire (1849–, 1872–1918)
 Idrisid Emirate (1906–1934)
 Southern
 Aden city
 Aden Province (1839–1937)
 Colony of Aden (1937–1963)
 Regional
 Aden Protectorate (1874–1959)
 Federation of Arab Emirates of the South (1959–1962)
 Federation of South Arabia (1962–1967)
 Protectorate of South Arabia (1963–1967)

South Arabia in recent history
Independent Yemen:
 Unified
 Republic of Yemen (1990–present)
 Northern
 Idrisid Emirate (1906–1934)
 Mutawakkilite Kingdom of Yemen (1918–1962)
 Yemen Arab Republic (1962–1990)
 Southern
 Qu'aiti Sultanate (1858–1967)
 People's Republic of South Yemen (1967–1970)
 People's Democratic Republic of Yemen (1970–1990)
 Other articles
 Yemenite Reunification (1990)
 North Yemen & South Yemen
 Democratic Republic of Yemen (1994)
 Greater Yemen
 Houthi insurgency in Yemen (2015)

South Arabia outside the Republic of Yemen
 Najran, Jizan, 'Asir, Al-Bahah in Saudi Arabia
 Dhofar in Oman

See also
 Greater Yemen

References

See also
 List of Yemen-related topics
 Official Website of the Al-Quaiti Royal Family of Hadhramaut

External links

 
Arabian Peninsula
History of the Arabian Peninsula
Geography of Western Asia
Geography of Yemen
Historical regions
Historical regions in Saudi Arabia
Divided regions